

Medalists

Heats

Final

References
Results

3000 metres at the World Athletics Indoor Championships
3000 metres Men